In mathematics, hyperbolic space of dimension n is the unique simply connected, n-dimensional Riemannian manifold of constant sectional curvature equal to -1. It is homogeneous, and satisfies the stronger property of being a symmetric space. Hyperbolic 2-space, H2, which was the first instance studied, is also called the hyperbolic plane. 

It is also sometimes referred to as Lobachevsky space or Bolyai–Lobachevsky space after the names of the author who first published on the topic of hyperbolic geometry. Sometimes the qualificative "real" is added to differentiate it from complex hyperbolic spaces, quaternionic hyperbolic spaces and the octononic hyperbolic plane which are the other symmetric spaces of negative curvature. 

Hyperbolic space serves as the prototype of a Gromov hyperbolic space which is a far-reaching notion including differential-geometric as well as more combinatorial spaces via a synthetic approach to negative curvature. Another generalisation is the notion of a CAT(-1) space.

Formal definition and models

Definition
The -dimensional hyperbolic space or Hyperbolic -space, usually denoted , is the unique simply connected, -dimensional complete Riemannian manifold with a constant negative sectional curvature equal to -1. The unicity means that any two Riemannian manifolds which satisfy these properties are isometric to each other. It is a consequence of the Killing–Hopf theorem.

Models of hyperbolic space

There are many such constructions or models of hyperbolic space, each suited to different aspects of its study. They are isometric to each other according to the previous paragraph, and in each case an explicit isometry can be explicitly given. Here is a list of the better-known models which are described in more detail in their namesake articles: 

 Poincaré half-plane model: this is the upper-half space  with the metric 
The isometry to the half-space model can be realised by a homography sending a point of the unit sphere to infinity. 
 Hyperboloid model: In contrast with the previous two models this realises hyperbolic -space as isometrically embedded inside the -dimensional Minkowski space (which is not a Riemannian but rather a Lorentzian manifold). The isometry to the previous models can be realised by stereographic projection from the hyperboloid to the plane , taking the vertex from which to project to be  for the ball and a point at infinity in the cone  inside projective space for the half-space. 
Symmetric space: Hyperbolic -space can be realised as the symmetric space of the simple Lie group  (the group of isometries of the quadratic form  with positive determinant); as a set the latter is the coset space .

Geometric properties

Parallel lines
Hyperbolic space, developed independently by Nikolai Lobachevsky, János Bolyai and Carl Friedrich Gauss, is a geometrical space analogous to Euclidean space, but such that Euclid's parallel postulate is no longer assumed to hold.  Instead, the parallel postulate is replaced by the following alternative (in two dimensions):
 Given any line L and point P not on L, there are at least two distinct lines passing through P which do not intersect L.
It is then a theorem that there are infinitely many such lines through P. This axiom still does not uniquely characterize the hyperbolic plane up to isometry; there is an extra constant, the curvature ,  which must be specified. However, it does uniquely characterize it up to homothety, meaning up to bijections which only change the notion of distance by an overall constant. By choosing an appropriate length scale, one can thus assume, without loss of generality, that .

Euclidean embeddings

The hyperbolic plane cannot be isometrically embedded into Euclidean 3-space by Hilbert's theorem. On the other hand the Nash embedding theorem implies that hyperbolic n-space can be isometrically embedded into some Euclidean space of larger dimension (4 for the hyperbolic plane). 

When isometrically embedded to a Euclidean space every point of a hyperbolic space is a saddle point.

Volume growth and isoperimetric inequality

The volume of balls in hyperbolic space increases exponentially with respect to the radius of the ball rather than polynomially as in Euclidean space. Namely, if  is any ball of radius  in  then:
where  is the total volume of the Euclidean -sphere of radius 1.

The hyperbolic space also satisfies a linear isoperimetric inequality, that is there exists a constant  such that any embedded disk whose boundary has length  has area at most . This is to be contrasted with Euclidean space where the isoperimetric inequality is quadratic.

Other metric properties

There are many more metric properties of hyperbolic space which differentiate it from Euclidean space. Some can be generalised to the setting of Gromov-hyperbolic spaces which is a generalisation of the notion of negative curvature to general metric spaces using only the large-scale properties. A finer notion is that of a CAT(-1)-space.

Hyperbolic manifolds

Every complete, connected, simply connected manifold of constant negative curvature −1 is isometric to the real hyperbolic space Hn. As a result, the universal cover of any closed manifold M of constant negative curvature −1, which is to say, a hyperbolic manifold, is  Hn. Thus, every such M can be written as Hn/Γ where Γ is a torsion-free discrete group of isometries on Hn.  That is, Γ is a lattice in SO+(n,1).

Riemann surfaces 
Two-dimensional hyperbolic surfaces can also be understood according to the language of Riemann surfaces. According to the uniformization theorem, every Riemann surface is either elliptic, parabolic or hyperbolic. Most hyperbolic surfaces have a non-trivial fundamental group π1=Γ; the groups that arise this way are known as Fuchsian groups. The quotient space H²/Γ of the upper half-plane modulo the fundamental group is known as the Fuchsian model of the hyperbolic surface. The Poincaré half plane is also hyperbolic, but is simply connected and noncompact. It is the universal cover of the other hyperbolic surfaces.

The analogous construction for three-dimensional hyperbolic surfaces is the Kleinian model.

See also
 Dini's surface
 Hyperbolic 3-manifold
 Ideal polyhedron
 Mostow rigidity theorem
 Murakami–Yano formula
 Pseudosphere

References

 Ratcliffe, John G., Foundations of hyperbolic manifolds, New York, Berlin. Springer-Verlag, 1994.
 Reynolds, William F. (1993) "Hyperbolic Geometry on a Hyperboloid", American Mathematical Monthly 100:442–455.
 Wolf, Joseph A. Spaces of constant curvature, 1967. See page 67.

Homogeneous spaces
Hyperbolic geometry
Topological spaces